Euphorion of Chalcis was a Greek poet and grammarian, born at Chalcis in Euboea about 275 BC.

Euphorion spent much of his life in Athens, where he amassed great wealth. After studying philosophy with Lacydes and Prytanis, he became the student and eromenos of the poet Archeboulus. About 221 he was invited by Antiochus the Great to the court of Syria. He assisted in the formation of the royal Library of Antioch, of which he held the post of librarian till his death. He wrote mythological epics (the Thrax), amatory elegies, epigrams and a satirical poem (Arae, "curses") after the manner of the Ibis of Callimachus.

Prose works on antiquities and history are also attributed to him. Like Lycophron, he was fond of using archaic and obsolete expressions, and the erudite character of his allusions rendered his language very obscure. His elegies were highly esteemed by the Romans—they were imitated or translated by Cornelius Gallus and also by the emperor Tiberius.

Fragments published in Meineke, De Euphorionis Chalcidensis vita et scriptis, in his Analecta Alexandrina (1843) began the modern editions of the surviving fragments of Euphorion. Further lines have been recovered from papyri of Oxyrhynchus and elsewhere.

Notes

References
 "Euphorion " – Dictionary of Greek and Roman Biography and Mythology

Further reading
Euphorion Who's Who in the Greek World by John Hazel.
Euphorion bibliography 
Magnelli, Enrico 2002. Studi su Euforione (Rome)
Powell, Johannes U. (1925) 1981.Collectanea Alexandrina: Reliquiae minores poetarum Graecorum aetatis Ptolemaicae 323–146 A.C. (Oxford: Oxford University Press, 1925; reprinted Chicago 1981). Euphorion, pp. 28–58.
Lightfoot, Jane L., Hellenistic Collection; Philitas, Alexander of Aetolia, Hermesianax, Euphorion, Parhenius, LCL 508, Cambridge MA 2009.
Latte, Kurt. 1968. "Der Thrax des Euphorion", Philologus 44 (1935) 129–55, reprinted in Latte, Kleine Schriften Munich 1968, pp 562–84.
Magnelli, Enrico 2002. Studi su Euforione(Rome)
 Franz Skutsch: Euphorion (4). In: Pauly Realencyclopädie of classical archeology (RE). Volume VI, 1, Stuttgart, 1907, 1174–1190 Sp.

Ancient Euboeans
Euphorion
Ancient Greek epigrammatists
Ancient Greek epic poets
Ancient Greek elegiac poets
3rd-century BC poets
Hellenistic poets
Hellenistic Athens
Year of death unknown
Epigrammatists of the Greek Anthology
People from Chalcis
270s BC births